Arthur Rolette Berthelet (October 12,1879September 16, 1949; credited as Rolette Bertheletto, Arthur Berthelet, and Arthur R. Berthelet) was an American actor, stage and film director, dialogue director, and scriptwriter. With regard to screen productions, he is best remembered for directing the 1916 crime drama Sherlock Holmes starring William Gillette, an actor who since 1899 had distinguished himself on the Broadway stage and at other prominent theatrical venues with his numerous, "definitive" portrayals of Sir Arthur Conan Doyle's great fictional detective. In 1918, Berthelet also directed the controversial author and feminist Mary MacLane in Men Who Have Made Love to Me, a production notable for being among the first cinematic dramas to break the "fourth wall" and among the earliest American film projects to bring together on screen a woman's work as a published author, "scenarist", actor, and narrator through the use of intertitles.

Early life
Born in Wisconsin in 1879, Arthur Berthelet was the third child of seven children of Louisa Matilda (née Thibault) and Joseph Reuben Berthelet, Jr. Both of Arthur's parents were Canadian natives, and his father supported the family working as a sewer-pipe manufacturer and later as a superintendent of the Milwaukee Cement Company. There are conflicting records regarding Arthur's educational background. A biographical sketch of him in 1916, one published in October that year in an American film-studio directory, states that he studied at the University of Notre Dame after attending public schools in Milwaukee. Yet, Berthelet himself certifies in the United States Census of 1940 that he actually completed his education only through the eighth grade.

Stage career
As early as 1899, twenty-year-old Berthelet is already identified in stage publications as a notable actor, who in that early period of his entertainment career was credited in reviews with his middle name "Rolette" instead of Arthur and with an Italianized surname, "Bertheletto". The San Francisco Dramatic Review, for example, reports in its October 21, 1899 issue about the performance of the play Magda starring Nance O'Neil and presented at the local California Theatre. Rolette Bertheletto is also highlighted in that production and complimented as "uncommonly good" in his role as Max, "the boylieutenant  in love with his cousin Marie". Six months later, in the April 14, 1900 issue of The San Francisco Dramatic Review, a special correspondent for trade paper describes a production of Quo Vadis conducted by the Lyceum Stock Company in Denver, Colorado. Berthelet, still a member of that company, is commended by the correspondent for his role as "Chilo" and is once again recognized with "honors" for his performance.

Berthelet for several years continued to travel extensively with stock companies. During 19031904, he was advertised as one of the "prominent" support players in a "farewell revival" of The Two Orphans starring the legendary actress Kate Claxton, who since the 1870s had made a career of performing as "Louise" in the well-known French play. Yet, Berthelet did not limit his acting to traveling shows. He also performed regularly on Broadway, appearing there in a variety of Shakespearean and contemporary-based plays such as King Henry V (1900), Beaucaire (1902), A Man's World (1910), and His Wife by His Side (1912) Over that span of time, however, he began to combine more and more his duties as an actor with directing stage productions and later with managing stock companies himself. He was managing summer stock in Portsmouth, Ohio between 1909 and 1911, and then left that position to manage Lucille La Verne's company before moving on in 1914 to serve as stage director for Grayce Scott in Richmond, Virginia. The next year in Richmond, in its July 11, 1915 issue, the Richmond Times-Dispatch announces to its readership the departure of Berthelet's "Bijou Stock Company":

Films
During the latter half of 1915, Berthelet began to transition professionally, moving from his career as a stage actor and as a director and manager of stock companies to working in the rapidly expanding motion picture industry. Essanay Studios in Chicago contracted him to direct several films, beginning with Tides That Meet, a three-reel romantic adventure set within "the unsettled conditions in Mexico". Released in early October 1915 and co-starring Bryant Washburn and Ann Kirk, the feature was widely promoted and popular with audiences for its "thrilling situations and hairbreadth escapes". Berthelet's next screen project for Essanay in 1915, another three-reeler, was Twice Into the Light. That melodrama starred John Lorenz and presented the story of a violinist who was born blind but ultimately found success musically and romantically after overcoming a series of physical and emotional struggles.

Sherlock Holmes

Following the positive film-industry and public reactions to Berthelet’s first two projects, Essanay assigned him to direct longer, more elaborate "photoplays" such as The Misleading Lady (1916), The Primitive Strain (1916), Sherlock Holmes (1916), and Vultures of Society (1916). Sherlock Holmes proved to be an especially challenging and notable release for Berthelet. The production—the first American film to portray Sir Arthur Conan Doyle's very popular fictional detective—features American actor William Gillette, who since 1899 had already performed on stage as Sherlock Holmes hundreds of times on Broadway and in select theatres in Canada and England. Widely recognized and celebrated for being the definitive interpreter of Holmes, Gillette was an authority on all of Doyle's related writings. Berthelet's own experience as a stage performer and his substantial knowledge of stage management made him an ideal director to adapt effectively a portrayal of Doyle's eloquent detective to a silent format dependent solely on pantomime and intertitles. In addition to directing a acclaimed expert in the role of Holmes, Berthelet had to film the seven-reel, 116-minute motion picture in Chicago and select exterior locations in that city to represent believably areas of London between the late Victorian and Edwardian eras. The results of his work received widespread accolades in 1916 film-industry publications and newspapers. Critic James S. McQuade of the New York trade journal The Moving Picture World praised Berthelet for the film's composition and general appearance, stating that "The settings are worthy of the acted production, and these and talented direction must be credited to Director Arthur Berthelet." In its assessment of the film, Motion Picture News, another widely read trade journal, judged the direction of this film version of Gillette's stage play as "excellent". The reviewer for Motography, Genevieve Harris, in her June 10, 1916 examination of Sherlock Holmes describes the film overall as "well produced" but questions the decision to extend the picture's length to nearly two hours, a running time that she contends detrimentally affects the story's pacing and clarity in some parts:
Although the critic for Motography found the running time of Sherlock Holmes too long, other prominent reviewers did not consider it excessive for presenting a thorough portrayal of Holmes. The New York Clipper, which in 1916 was promoted as "The Oldest Theatrical Journal in America", applauded Berthelet's work as both a critical and commercial achievement:

Final Essanay films, 1917-1918
Berthelet continued to direct features and shorts at Essanay for two years after the release of Sherlock Holmes. The studio in 1917 released no less than ten of his productions. Some of those motion pictures include Little Shoes, The Saint's Adventure, The Golden Idiot, The Quarantined Bridegroom, Pants, and Young Mother Hubbard. In 1917, Berthelet also wrote the story that was later developed into Essanay's comedy crime drama Beauty and the Rogue, a production directed the next year by Berthelet's studio colleague Henry King. The next year, in 1918, before leaving Essanay, Berthelet completed two releases, one being his most controversial production, Men Who Have Made Love to Me. The latter motion picture, which is currently classified by the Library of Congress as a lost film, was adapted from a 1902 memoir written by feminist author and social activist Mary MacLane and published in 1902. Her book, simply titled The Story of Mary MacLane, recounts with, as one period publication described it, "astonishingly frank truths about herself" and six love affairs she had with men of different ages, marital circumstances, and from different educational, economic, and social backgrounds. Working with MacLane, who was naturally cast as the lead in a film version of her autobiographical work, and who co-wrote the screenplay, Berthelet had the tasks of tactfully adapting MacLane's sensational literary work to the screen, to craft a "seven-reel vampire photoplay" in a time when the physical aspects of making love were customarily implied or symbolically represented.

From the outset of developing Men Who Have Made Love to Me, Berthelet sought to elevate public perceptions of the film's subject matter by establishing unusually high production values for the picture. Exhibitors Herald in October 1917 reported on the director's early development of sets for the project and attention to detail:

Retirement
By 1940, Berthelet continued to work as a freelance dialogue director, hired under contract by various film studios to assist in screening and training new actors and refining the on-camera speaking style and dialects of rising stars. Soon, though, he began to curtail his work in the movie business, a move likely prompted by his declining health due to advanced arteriosclerosis. Nevertheless, he is credited as a dialogue director up to late 1947, specifically for his work during the production of the 20th Century Fox film The Tender Years starring Joe E. Brown.

Personal life and death
Berthelet married only once. In 1910, he and actress Leona Ball, an Arkansas native (1880—1958), wed after meeting and working together as cast members in the Savage Repertory Company's presentation of Molnár's play The Devil. The couple, who had two sons, Joseph and John, would remain together for nearly 40 years, until Arthur's death.

Twenty months after the release of the comedy The Tender Years in January 1948, Berthelet died while being treated for ongoing circulatory problems at Casa Del Mar Sanitarium near Vista, California, located approximately 100 miles southeast of Hollywood. According to his official death certificate, dated September 16, 1949, he died from a brain hemorrhage. He was survived by his wife Leona, their two sons, and by two of his brothers and two sisters. Following a memorial service at Berry Mortuary in Oceanside, California, Berthelet was buried at nearby Eternal Hills Memorial Park.

Selected filmography 

 Enemies of Youth (1925)
 Penny of Top Hill Trail (1921)
 Young America (1918)
 The Lighted Lamp (1918)
 The Lie That Failed (1918)
 Men Who Have Made Love to Me (1918)
 Young Mother Hubbard (1917)
 Pants (1917)
 The Quarantined Bridegroom (1917) 
 The Golden Idiot (1917)
 Aladdin Up-To-Date (1917)
 Where Is My Mother. (1917)
 Pass the Hash, Ann (1917)
 Our Boys (1917)
 The Saint's Adventure (1917)
 Little Shoes (1917)
 According to the Code (1916)
 Orphan Joyce (1916) 
 The Chaperon (1916)
 The Return of Eve (1916)
 Sherlock Holmes (1916)
 The Havoc (1916)
 Vultures of Society (1916)
 The Misleading Lady (1916)
 The Primitive Strain (1916) 
 Twice Into the Light (1915)
 Tides That Meet (1915)

Notes

References

External links

 
 

1879 births
1949 deaths
American film directors
Male actors from Milwaukee
Film directors from Wisconsin